Timmins—James Bay is a federal electoral district in Ontario, Canada, that has been represented in the House of Commons of Canada since 1997. Its population in 2011 was 83,104.

The district includes the extreme eastern part of the District of Kenora, all of the District of Cochrane except for the central western part, and a small part south of Timmins, and all of the District of Timiskaming except for the extreme southeastern part.

Geography
Timmins—James Bay consists of
 the part of the Territorial District of Kenora lying east of a line drawn from the northeast corner of the most northerly point of the Territorial District of Thunder Bay (Albany River) due north to Hudson Bay;
 the Territorial District of Cochrane, excluding the part bounded by a line drawn from the western limit of the territorial district east along the northern limits of the townships of Boyce, Boyce, Shuel, Mulloy, Fintry, Auden, Rogers, Fushimi, Bannerman, Ritchie, Mulvey, Goldwin, Sweet, Hillmer, McKnight, Boyle, Mowbray, Howells, Sheldon, Pinard and Mewhinney, south along the eastern boundaries of the townships of Mewhinney, Bourassa, Tolmie, Menapia, Beniah, Colquhoun and Calder, west along the northern boundary of the Township of Ottaway, south along the western boundaries of the townships of Ottaway, Beck, Lucas and Prosser, and west along the southern boundaries of the townships of Carnegie, Reid, Thorburn, Moberly, Aitken, Poulett, Watson and Lisgar, to the southwestern limit of the territorial district;
 the part of the Territorial District of Timiskaming bounded by a line drawn from the northeast corner of the Township of Harris, west along the northern boundaries of the townships of Harris, Dymond, Hudson, Lundy, Auld and Speight, and south along the western boundaries of the townships of Speight, Van Nostrand and Leo to the southern limit of the territorial district.

History
Timmins—James Bay was created in 1996 from parts of Cochrane—Superior and Timiskaming—Cochrane ridings.

It consisted initially of:
 the part of the Territorial District of Cochrane lying west and north of a line drawn from the southeast corner of the City of Timmins north and west along the east and north limits of the city north along the east boundaries of the Townships of Prosser, Lucas, Beck and Ottaway, west and north along the south and west boundary of the Township of Clute, north along the east boundary of the Township of Colquhoun, and east along the south boundaries of the Townships of Marven, Thorning, Potter, Sangster, Bragg, Newman, Tomlinson, Hurtubise and St. Laurent,
 the part of the Territorial District of Kenora lying east of a line drawn north from the most northerly northeast corner of the Territorial District of Thunder Bay to Hudson Bay.

In 2003, it was given its current boundaries as described above.

This riding gained a fraction of territory from Nipissing—Timiskaming during the 2012 electoral redistribution.

Members of Parliament
This riding has elected the following Members of Parliament:

Election results

			

Note: Change from 2000 is based on redistributed results. Conservative Party change is based on the combination of Canadian Alliance and Progressive Conservative Party totals.

Note: Canadian Alliance vote is compared to the Reform vote in 1997 election.

See also
 List of Canadian federal electoral districts
 Past Canadian electoral districts

References

Notes

External links
2011 results from Elections Canada
 Campaign expense data from Elections Canada

Ontario federal electoral districts
Politics of Timmins
Kirkland Lake